Bjelland Point is a headland on the north coast of South Georgia, immediately south of Second Milestone and  east-northeast of Robertson Point. It was surveyed by the South Georgia Survey in the period 1951–57, and named by the UK Antarctic Place-Names Committee for Sigurd L. Bjelland, Manager of the South Georgia Whaling Co station at Leith Harbor for several years beginning in 1951.

References 

Headlands of South Georgia